Christopher Matthew Jent (born January 11, 1970) is an American basketball coach and former player who is an assistant coach for the Los Angeles Lakers of the National Basketball Association (NBA).  He was formerly the head coach of the Bakersfield Jam of the NBA Development League.

Early life and college career
Jent was born in Orange, California and grew up in Sparta, New Jersey. After attending high school at Sparta High School (New Jersey), he played college basketball for the Ohio State Buckeyes, leaving in 1992 after four seasons.

Professional playing career
Undrafted in the 1992 NBA draft, Jent was drafted in the fourth round (50th overall) in the 1992 CBA draft. Jent began his professional career with CBA teams Rapid City Thrillers and Columbus Horizon.

He had a brief career in the NBA, playing three games each for the Houston Rockets (winning a championship ring in 1994) and New York Knicks (1996–97). He played in 11 playoff games in 1994, thus giving him the rare distinction of having played in more career playoff-games than regular-season games in the NBA. In between his stints with the Rockets and the Knicks, he played with the Australian NBL's North Melbourne Giants in 1995 and also played in Italy, Spain and Greece.

Coaching career

Philadelphia 76ers (2003–2004) 
Jent was an assistant coach for the Philadelphia 76ers in the 2003–04 season.

Orlando Magic (2004–2005) 
The next season, Jent worked in the same capacity with the Orlando Magic, and was appointed interim head coach for the final 18 games of the 2004–05 season (going 5–13), after Johnny Davis was fired. At the start of the next season he was replaced by Brian Hill.

Cleveland Cavaliers (2006–2011) 
Beginning in November 2006, Jent took on the role of Assistant Coach/Director of Player Development with the Cleveland Cavaliers. He served as LeBron James' personal shooting coach while James was on the team.

Ohio State (2011–2013) 
On June 29, 2011, Ohio State head basketball coach Thad Matta introduced Jent as an assistant coach for the Buckeyes.

Sacramento Kings (2013–2014) 
On June 10, 2013, Jent became an assistant coach with the Sacramento Kings. He was relieved of his duty on December 16, 2014.

Bakersfield Jam (2015–2016) 
Jent would later on be the newest head coach for the Bakersfield Jam in 2015 after their former head coach ended up accepting an assistant coach/leading player development position for the Phoenix Suns.

Return to Ohio State (2016–2017) 
Jent returned to Ohio State as an assistant following the 2015–16 season.

Atlanta Hawks (2017–2022) 
For the 2017–18 season, Jent was hired as an assistant coach with the Atlanta Hawks.

Los Angeles Lakers (2022-present) 
For the 2022–23 season, Jent was hired as an assistant coach for the Los Angeles Lakers.

Head coaching record

|- 
| style="text-align:left;"|Orlando
| style="text-align:left;"|
|18||5||13|||| style="text-align:center;"|3rd in Southeast||—||—||—||—
| style="text-align:center;"|Missed Playoffs
|- class="sortbottom"
| style="text-align:left;"|Career
| ||18||5||13|||| ||—||—||—||—

References

1970 births
Living people
American expatriate basketball people in Australia
American expatriate basketball people in Greece
American expatriate basketball people in Italy
American expatriate basketball people in Spain
American men's basketball coaches
American men's basketball players
Andrea Costa Imola players
Atlanta Hawks assistant coaches
Atlantic City Seagulls players
Bakersfield Jam coaches
Basketball coaches from California
Basketball players from California
Basketball coaches from New Jersey
Basketball players from New Jersey
Cleveland Cavaliers assistant coaches
Columbus Horizon players
Connecticut Pride players
Greek Basket League players
Houston Rockets players
Joventut Badalona players
Liga ACB players
New York Knicks players
North Melbourne Giants players
Ohio State Buckeyes men's basketball coaches
Ohio State Buckeyes men's basketball players
Orlando Magic assistant coaches
Orlando Magic head coaches
Pallacanestro Reggiana players
Panionios B.C. players
Parade High School All-Americans (boys' basketball)
People from Sparta, New Jersey
Philadelphia 76ers assistant coaches
Rapid City Thrillers players
Sacramento Kings assistant coaches
Shooting guards
Sportspeople from Orange, California
Sportspeople from Sussex County, New Jersey
Undrafted National Basketball Association players